Beria is a surname. Notable people with the surname include:

 Lavrentiy Beria (1899–1953), Soviet politician
 Franck Béria (born 1983), French footballer

Surnames of Georgian origin
Georgian-language surnames
Surnames of Abkhazian origin